Wenquan is a town of Kai County in the northeast of Chongqing Municipality, People's Republic of China, located more than  northeast of central Chongqing. , it has three residential communities (社区) and 11 villages under its administration.

References 

Township-level divisions of Chongqing